Sérgio Araújo de Melo, usually known as Sérgio Araújo (born September 12, 1963 in Timóteo, Minas Gerais), was an association football winger. He is currently a farmer in Brazil.

Playing career
Having been born and raised in the region of Minas Gerais it was in the famous club Atlético Mineiro that Sérgio Araújo started to show his speed and moves, scoring goals and assisting his teammates. Naturally Sérgio was picked by Brazilian manager to play for his national team, playing his first international match (a friendly) against Uruguay (March 1987). In the following month he scored his first goal for Brazil against Bolivia (2–2 was the final result). His final international match was in December 1987 against West Germany (another friendly). During this short period he played 10 international matches, playing aside well known players such as Douglas, Bebeto, Valdo, Raí, Müller and Ricardo Gomes. At Atlético Mineiro he, as well as Aílton, was part of the team that won the Conmebol Cup in 1992. Between 1988 and 1989, he played 39 games and scored nine goals for Flamengo.

In late 1993, Sérgio Araújo moved to Portuguese club Vitória Setúbal, joining a team where Yekini was the star. He played his first match against Benfica in an astonishing 5–2 win, scoring one goal in his debut. Araújo played around 20 games that season, only scoring for 3 times. 
Just before the 1994–1995 season, the Nigerian striker Yekini moved to Olympiacos Piraeus, and the team was severely weakened. Vitória Setúbal only won three games, and was relegated. Sérgio Araújo, due to several injuries could not be of great help to the club, and was dismissed in the end of the season.
He ended his career in Brazil, returning to Minas Gerais to be a successful farm owner.

Besides having played for Atlético Mineiro, Flamengo and Vitória de Setúbal, he has also played for Fluminense, Vasco, Grêmio, Guarani, Ponte Preta, XV de Piracicaba, América (SP), Internacional de Limeira, Villa Nova, and Serra.

Managerial career
After retiring, he worked for two years as Operário (VG)'s manager, leaving the club in 2008 to work as Villa Nova's youth squad manager.

Honours
Copa Conmebol 1992

References

1963 births
Living people
Brazilian footballers
Brazilian expatriate footballers
Brazil international footballers
Brazilian football managers
Association football midfielders
Clube Atlético Mineiro players
CR Flamengo footballers
Fluminense FC players
CR Vasco da Gama players
Grêmio Foot-Ball Porto Alegrense players
Guarani FC players
Associação Atlética Ponte Preta players
Vitória F.C. players
Esporte Clube XV de Novembro (Piracicaba) players
América Futebol Clube (SP) players
Associação Atlética Internacional (Limeira) players
Villa Nova Atlético Clube players
Expatriate footballers in Portugal
Brazilian farmers